Oluyinka 'Yinka' Lola Idowu (born 25 February 1972) is a female former British athlete.

Athletics career
Idowu competed in the women's long jump at the 1992 Summer Olympics. She represented England and won a silver medal in the long jump event, at the 1994 Commonwealth Games in Victoria, British Columbia, Canada.

References

1972 births
Living people
Athletes (track and field) at the 1992 Summer Olympics
British female long jumpers
Olympic athletes of Great Britain
Commonwealth Games medallists in athletics
Commonwealth Games silver medallists for England
Athletes (track and field) at the 1994 Commonwealth Games
Medallists at the 1994 Commonwealth Games